No Strings is a musical drama with book by Samuel A. Taylor and words and music by Richard Rodgers. No Strings is the only Broadway score for which Rodgers wrote both lyrics and music, and the first musical he composed after the death of his long-time collaborator, Oscar Hammerstein II. The musical opened on Broadway in 1962 and ran for 580 performances.  It received six Tony Award nominations, winning three, for Best Leading Actress in a Musical, Best Original Score and Best Choreography.

Productions
The world premiere of No Strings was at the O'Keefe Centre (now Meridian Hall) in Toronto. The U.S. premiere was at the Fisher Theater in Detroit, where the show ran from January 15 to February 3, 1962.

The musical opened on March 15, 1962, at the 54th Street Theatre in New York. It ran for slightly more than six months before transferring to the Broadhurst Theatre, where it continued until August of the following year, for a total of 580 performances and one preview. Joe Layton was both director and choreographer, with Diahann Carroll and Richard Kiley starring. Carroll won a Tony Award for Best Actress in a Musical, a first for an African-American. Barbara McNair and Howard Keel replaced them later in the run.  
 
In December 1963, an equally successful production in London, starring Art Lund and Beverly Todd, opened at Her Majesty's Theatre.

In 2003, a staged concert production was held at New York City Center as a part of its Encores! series. This production starred James Naughton and Maya Days and was directed and choreographed by Ann Reinking.

Background
The civil rights movement — voter registration for blacks, integration, and fairness and equality in the workplace — was starting to gain momentum in the United States in the early 1960s, but it was a topic largely absent on Broadway. Neither the book nor score make specific mention of race, nor does it impact upon any decisions made by the couple, but Rodgers has addressed the issue. Other than the model's reference to growing up north of Central Park (seemingly an allusion to Harlem), there is nothing in the script to suggest she's African-American. It was only in the casting of Carroll and Richard Kiley as the star-crossed lovers that the subject of interracial romance surfaced. Any production of the show easily could be cast with two leads of the same race without changing the content in any significant way. Nevertheless, the casting was socially progressive at the time.

Rodgers got the idea for casting a black actress in the star role after viewing Diahann Carroll on The Tonight Show.
He felt that the casting spoke for itself and any specific references to race in the play were unnecessary. Rodgers said: "Rather than shrinking from the issue of  race, such an approach would demonstrate our respect for the audience's ability to accept our theme free from rhetoric or sermons."
However, the characters' reluctance to discuss race was controversial.

Synopsis
Fashion model Barbara Woodruff, living in Paris, meets and falls in love with expatriate American, David Jordan, a Pulitzer Prize-winning novelist who has suffered from an intense case of writer's block since his arrival in France. She attempts to restore his confidence in his creativity, but the easy life he's enjoying, flitting about Monte Carlo, Honfleur, Deauville, and St. Tropez, is too much of a distraction. Concluding that he can work only if he returns home to Maine, he invites her to go with him; but, realizing they have no future together, they part with "no strings" attached.

Song list

Act I
 The Sweetest Sounds
 How Sad
 Loads of Love
 The Man Who Has Everything
 Be My Host
 La La La
 You Don't Tell Me
 Love Makes the World Go
 Nobody Told Me

Act II      
 Look No Further
 Maine
 An Orthodox Fool
 Eager Beaver
 No Strings
 Maine (Reprise)
 The Sweetest Sounds

The score was arranged and orchestrated without string instruments to underscore the show's title.

Awards and nominations

Original Broadway production

References
Broadway: The American Musical

External links
 
RNH Theatricals site for No Strings
No Strings plot, history, song list at guidetomusicaltheatre.com

1962 musicals
Broadway musicals
Original musicals
Compositions by Richard Rodgers
Plays set in France
Tony Award-winning musicals